Passion or Bab al-Makam is a Syrian feature drama film by director Mohamed Malas.

Awards
Marrakech International Film Festival - Special Jury Award, 2005.

References

External links
 

2005 films
Syrian drama films
2000s Arabic-language films
Films directed by Mohammad Malas